Chuhuiv or Chuguev is a city in Kharkiv Oblast, Ukraine. The city is the administrative center of Chuhuiv Raion (district). It hosts the administration of Chuhuiv urban hromada, one of the hromadas of Ukraine. Population: 

Chuhuiv's food industry focuses on producing mayonnaise along with other staple supporting condiments.

History
The City's founding date is disputed with historical assertions ranging from 1540 to 1627. Some academics believe that the city was built upon the orders Russia's first Tsar Ivan the Terrible who reigned from 1547 to 1584.

A military fort was built adjacent to the city in 1638 by Ukrainian Cossacks of Yakiv Ostryanyn (see Ostryanyn uprising) on the order of Muscovite Tsar Mikhail Fedorovich. A military presence of some form near Chuhuiv has remained ever since. The Chuguev uprising of 1819 was a revolt of military settlers.

During the government of the Soviet Union, the base became an important military training center. It has been home to the Soviet Air Force Pilot Academy and the Red Army's Artillery School. There is now a Ukrainian Air Force base adjacent to the town.

Military history

The city was the home of a major Soviet Air Force base and a military pilot's academy. There is now a Ukrainian Air Force base near the city.

Generally, the city has been an important military point since Cossack times. There was a Soviet Red Army Artillery School (a military academy) in Chuhuiv before World War II.

On 25 September 2020 an An-26 military plane with cadets of the Ivan Kozhedub National Air Force University crashed and caught fire near Chuhuiv. 26 people were killed and the sole survivor was seriously injured.

Present day
There are eight schools in Chuhuiv (grades 1–11), where several Peace Corps volunteers have served since 2004.

Until 18 July 2020, Chuhuiv was incorporated as a city of oblast significance and the center of Chuhuiv Municipality. The municipality was abolished in July 2020 as part of the administrative reform of Ukraine, which reduced the number of raions of Kharkiv Oblast to seven. The area of Chuhuiv Municipality was merged into Chuhuiv Raion.

As part of the Russian invasion of Ukraine, Chuhuiv was shelled by Russian forces on February 24, 2022. A 14-year-old boy was killed. On the same day, an air base near the city was attacked. Russia captured the city in late February. On 7 March 2022, Ukrainian forces had retaken the city and inflicted heavy casualties on Russian forces, including killing two high-ranking Russian officers during the battle.

Notable people
 Inna Dorofeieva (born 1965), ballerina
 Ilya Repin (1840-1933), sculptor and painter of the Peredvizhniki art school
 Sigrid Schauman (1877-1979), artist and art critic

Education

Preschool education
 Chuhuiv preschool educational institution (nursery - kindergarten) No. 1
 Chuhuiv preschool educational institution (nursery - kindergarten) No. 3
 Chuhuiv preschool educational institution (nursery - kindergarten) No. 4
 Chuhuiv preschool educational institution (nursery - kindergarten) No. 8
 Chuhuiv preschool educational institution (nursery - kindergarten) No. 12
 Pre-school unit of Chuguev teaching and educational complex No. 6
 Preschool educational institution VESELOCHKA, VCH А0501

There were six pre-school educational institutions and one pre-school unit as part of the Teaching and Educational Complex No. 6 in the city, in the 2013–2014 academic year; they educated 1 195 preschoolers between the ages of 2 and 6 (7) years old.

General secondary education

Includes nine schools:
 Ilya Repin Chuguiv comprehensive school of I-III levels No. 1
 Chuguiv comprehensive school of I-III levels No. 2
 Chuguiv comprehensive school of I level No. 3
 Chuguiv comprehensive school of I-II levels No. 4
 Chuguiv gymnasium No. 5
 I. N. Kozhedub, triple Hero of the Soviet Union, Chuguiv teaching and educational complex No. 6
 Chuguiv comprehensive school of I-III levels No. 7
 Chuguiv specialized school of I-III levels No. 8 with advanced study of foreign languages
 Kluhyno-Bashkyrivsʹka comprehensive school of I-III levels

Out-of-school education
 Chuguiv Centre of Tourism and Local History
 Chuguiv House of Children and Youth Creativity
 Chuguiv Children and Youth Sports School

Specialized technical schools
 Chuguiv Professional Lyceum
 Chuguiv Professional Agrarian Lyceum

Gallery

References

 
Cities in Kharkiv Oblast
Kharkov Governorate
Ukrainian Air Force
Donets
Cities of regional significance in Ukraine
Cities and towns built in the Sloboda Ukraine